Giovanni Aparecido Adriano dos Santos (born 5 February 1987), known as Giovanni, is a Brazilian footballer who plays as a goalkeeper for Novorizontino.

Career
Giovanni started in the youth ranks of Marília and became the first team's goalkeeper in 2008. He was lent to Ponte Preta in 2009, where he played in the Série B. In the following year he was lent again, this time to Grêmio Prudente in the Série A.

In 2011 Giovanni was signed by Atlético Mineiro, where he at first served as backup for Renan Ribeiro, but eventually made it into the first squad. He was Atlético's first-choice goalkeeper in the 2012 Campeonato Mineiro, won by the club, but returned to the bench after the arrival of Victor later in the same year.

On 29 June 2018, Giovanni terminated his contract with Atlético after over seven years at the club.

After leaving Atlético, he signed with Guarani FC.

Career statistics
Correct

Honours
Atlético Mineiro
Campeonato Mineiro: 2012, 2013, 2015, 2017
Copa Libertadores: 2013
Recopa Sudamericana: 2014
Copa do Brasil: 2014

References

External links
  
 Clube Atlético Mineiro profile 
 

1987 births
Living people
People from Bauru
Brazilian footballers
Association football goalkeepers
Campeonato Brasileiro Série A players
Campeonato Brasileiro Série B players
Campeonato Brasileiro Série C players
Marília Atlético Clube players
Associação Atlética Ponte Preta players
Grêmio Barueri Futebol players
Clube Atlético Mineiro players
Guarani FC players
Paysandu Sport Club players
Esporte Clube Água Santa players
Grêmio Novorizontino players
Copa Libertadores-winning players
Footballers from São Paulo (state)